Celtis koraiensis, commonly known as  the Korean hackberry is a deciduous tree in the genus Celtis. The species is endemic to the Korean Peninsula and the north of China.

The tree flowers from April to May, and the fruit ripens from September to October.

Seed Dormancy 
Once the seeds of Celtis koraiensis go dormant, a process of cold stratification along with the addition of Gibberellic Acid (GA(3)) can be done to germinate the seeds. Seeds were able to germinate to a maximum of 45.2% under the conditions of 400 mg GA(3) alternating 4/15 degrees C.

References

 
 The Plant List

koraiensis
Flora of China
Trees of Korea